Liping County is a county in the southeast of Guizhou province, China, bordering Hunan to the east and Guangxi to the southeast. It is part of the Qiandongnan Miao and Dong Autonomous Prefecture.

History
The county was affected by the Miao rebellion of 1736-36. The county is home to many Dong people.
1322 (years to two years) set up a long lawsuit in Liping. The Liping government started to set up in 1413 to 1913, with a history of 500 years.
In 1283, eighty thousand people in the ancient state of the military and civilian (ancient state, this Leigh Bing Rory). To rule for two years (in 1322), the abolition of Zongguan Fu, Li Ping Village renamed Liping Zhai, in Ping lawsuit change Liping lawsuit, jurisdiction over 12 executive our, Huguang province state think appease our thought state, this cengong), Li Pingshi name.
On 1385, the abolition of Liping long lawsuit, built five Wei command division, military duct, administer 15 2 villages, 14 executive secretary. Ming Yongle eleven years (1413), the abolition of thinking, to appease our, suppose the Liping mansion in Liping village officer corps, attached to the Guizhou receives announcement administration to enable our, Tan Xi jurisdiction, eight boat, the ancient state, Cao drop Hou Fei, hung, drawn and ferro permanent from, Xishan Yang Dong (waste) seven executive our, implemented within civil military divide and conquer; Wu Kai Wei jurisdiction, Tun, Huguang.
In 1441, Ming orthodox six years, the abolition of Froude from chief permanent, permanent set from the county, under the Liping government. 1582 (ten years of Ming Dynasty), Liping government to civilian house, cure five Wei, Chen Yuan to control road zhifu. In 1600 the Liping government under the Huguang Province, 1603 under the Guizhou.
In 1730, a state Department of ancient Tongzhi, a house of Liping.
In 1950, Liping County in Dushan area, Tuyun area in 1952, 1956 was placed under the Qiandongnan Miao and Dong Autonomous prefecture.
2013, Liping County, Guizhou Province, the people's government is set to the provincial governing county pilot.

Administration
Liping County is divided into 2 subdistricts and 14 towns and 7 townships and 2 Ethnic townships. Defeng subdistrict is the county seat which houses Liping County Government and Liping County Council.
Subdistricts: Defeng, Gaotun
Towns: Zhongchao, Hongzhou, Shuikou, Zhaoxing, Shangzhong, Mengyan, Jiuchao, Aoshi, Yandong, Shuangjiang, Long'e, Diping, Yongcong, Maogong
Townships: Deshun, Dehua, Pingzhai, Dajia, Bazhai, Luoli, Koujiang
Ethnic Townships: Shunhua, Leidong

Climate

Education

Technical school
Liping medium vocational technical school

Senior school
Liping County, a total of 5 high school, respectively, as follows
Liping NO.1 Middle School
Liping NO.3 Middle School
Liping NO.4 Middle School
Liping NO.7 Middle School
Liping Hualong Middle School

Middle school
Liping County, a total of 25 Middle schools, respectively, as follows
Liping NO.2 Middle School
Liping NO.5 Middle School
Liping NO.6 Middle School
Liping Bazhai Middle School
Liping Maogong Middle School
Liping Jiuchao Middle School
Liping Dajia Middle School
Liping Mengyan Middle School
Liping Shangzhong Middle School
Liping Yudong Middle School
Liping Luoli Middle School
Liping Pingzhai Middle School
Liping Dehua Middle School
Liping Zhongchao Middle School
Liping Aoshi Middle School
Liping Hongzhou Middle School
Liping Deshun Middle School
Liping Yongcong Middle School
Liping Yandong Middle School
Liping Koujiang Middle School
Liping Shuangjiang Middle School
Liping Zhaoxing Middle School
Liping Shuikou Middle School
Liping Diping Middle School
Liping Long'e Middle School

Primary school
Liping County, a total of more than 300 primary schools, including urban primary school has 9, respectively, as follows,
Liping NO.1 Primary School
Liping NO.2 Primary School
Liping NO.3 Primary School
Liping NO.4 Primary School
Liping NO.5 Primary School
Liping Nanquan Primary School
Liping Xuejiaping Primary School
Liping Minsheng Primary School
Liping Luotuan Primary School

Transportation

Road
S308, S202, S222, S221 
G242, G356

Expressway
G76
Songtao–Congjiang Expressway
Jingzhou–Liping Expressway

Railway
Guiyang–Guangzhou High-Speed Railway-Congjiang Railway Station
Xingyi-Yongzhou Railway-Liping Railway Station

Airport
Liping County is served by Liping Airport located at Gaotun Subdistrict and Defeng Subdistrict.

Relative location

References

External links
Liping County official site 
National Geographic article about the Dong of Dimen (地扪), Liping County, by Amy Tan (2008)
NPR story about Dong folk songs, featuring Amy Tan, April 2008

 
County-level divisions of Guizhou
Counties of Qiandongnan Prefecture